Christian Friedrich von Glück (1 July 1755 – 20 January 1831) was a German jurist.

Born at Halle in the Duchy of Magdeburg on 1 July 1755, he studied from 1770 to 1776 at the University of Halle and on the 16 April 1777 he received a Doctor of Law for his dissertation . After seven years as a Privatdozent in 1784 he decided to go to Erlangen and became a professor of law at the Friedrich-Alexander-University. In 1785 he married Wilhelmine Elisabeth Geiger. From the marriage he had two sons, Christian Karl von Glück (1791–1867) and Christian Wilhelm von Glück (1810–1866), and a daughter. Christian Friedrich von Glück died on 20 January 1831 in Erlangen.

Works

Among his writings must be especially mentioned  (Erlangen 1790–1830, 34 volumes).

Bibliography

 

.

References 

1755 births
1831 deaths
People from Halle (Saale)
Jurists from Saxony-Anhalt
People from the Duchy of Magdeburg
University of Halle alumni
Academic staff of the University of Halle
Academic staff of the University of Erlangen-Nuremberg